Down by the Old Mainstream was American  Alternative country band Golden Smog's first full-length album, released in 1995. Its title is from a line in both the Wilco song, "Someday Soon" from the album, Being There, and from "Radio King," the last track on this album.

Background
Golden Smog was a loosely connected group of musicians comprising, at various times, members of Soul Asylum, The Replacements, Wilco, The Jayhawks, Run Westy Run, The Honeydogs and Big Star. Golden Smog's lineup has often changed, but relative constants who appear on all the recordings are guitarists Kraig Johnson (Run Westy Run), Dan Murphy (Soul Asylum) and Gary Louris (The Jayhawks), along with bassist Marc Perlman (The Jayhawks).

Reception

Writing for Allmusic, music critic Stephen Thomas Erlewine called the album "a loose, relaxed affair that sounds like it was a lot of fun to record...it has an offhand, relaxed charm that is sometimes lacking from Jayhawks and Soul Asylum albums. Not all of the songs are first rate—'Pecan Pie' and 'Red Headed Stepchild' are a bit too cute to be effective—but the performances are full of grit and fire, which is what makes Down By the Mainstream such an engaging listen." Jeff Gordinier of Entertainment Weekly wrote, "Golden Smog’s comfort food cries out for a little spice, but it warms you up, nonetheless."

Track listing
 "V" (Gary Louris, Kraig Johnson)
 "Ill Fated" (Dan Murphy)
 "Pecan Pie" (Jeff Tweedy)
 "Yesterday Cried" (Johnson)
 "Glad & Sorry" (Ronnie Lane)
 "Won't Be Coming Home" (Louris, Mark Olson)
 "He's a Dick" (Johnson)
 "Walk Where He Walked" (Tweedy)
 "Nowhere Bound" (Marc Perlman, Murphy, Johnson)
 "Friend" (Johnson)
 "She Don't Have to See You" (Bobby Patterson, Strickland)
 "Red Headed Stepchild" (Murphy, Perlman)
 "Williamton Angel" (Johnson)
 "Radio King" (Tweedy, Louris)

Personnel
The band members of Golden Smog used pseudonyms in the credits.

Rodney Amber (Joey Huffman) – organ, piano
Andrew Conlee – background vocals
Jarret Decatur (Kraig Johnson) – Chamberlin, drums, guitar, Bass, harmonica, mandolin, piano, slide guitar, tambourine, vocals, background vocals
Anthony James (Dave Pirner) – vocals
Michael Macklyn (Gary Louris) – guitar, piano, slide guitar, vocals,  background vocals
Leonardson Saratoga (Noah Levy) – drums, sound effects, tambourine,  background vocals
David Spear (Dan Murphy) – guitar, vocals, background vocals
Scot Summit (Jeff Tweedy) – bass, guitar, vocals, background vocals
Raymond Virginia (Marc Perlman) – bass, E-Bow, fuzz bass, guitar, mandolin, background vocals

Production notes
Sir James Bunchberry (Brian Paulson) – engineer, mixing, producer
Clive Mills – executive producer
Scott Hull – mastering
Rip Nordhaugan – photography
Brent Sigmeth – assistant engineer
Michael Sommens – drawing
Ken Lau – photography
Kraig Jarret – art direction, design

Chart positions

References 

Golden Smog albums
1995 debut albums
Rykodisc albums